The men's discus throw at the 2015 Asian Athletics Championships was held at the Wuhan, China on June 6.

Results

References
Results

Discus
Discus throw at the Asian Athletics Championships